Pablo Carreño Busta and Guillermo Durán were the defending champions, but Carreño Busta decided not to participate this year. Durán played alongside Andrés Molteni, but lost in the quarterfinals to Víctor Estrella Burgos and Renzo Olivo.

James Cerretani and Philipp Oswald won the title when Julio Peralta and Horacio Zeballos retired in the final.

Seeds

Draw

Draw

References
 Main Draw

Ecuador Open Quito - Doubles
Ecuador Open (tennis)